Professor Hoffmann (1839–1919) was the pseudonym of Angelo John Lewis, an English-born barrister and writer who has been described as "the most prolific and influential magic author and translator until modern times."<ref name=Lybrary>[https://www.lybrary.com/professor-hoffmann-m-21.html Professor Hoffmann] at lybrary.com. Retrieved 31 December 2021.</ref>

 Life 
Professor Hoffmann was born as Angelo John Lewis in London, England on 23 July 1839. He studied law at Oxford University and became a barrister in London.

During the early 1860s he learned magic from a book and became an amateur magician. Under the pen name Professor Hoffmann, in 1873 he published a series of articles in Routledge's Every Boy's Annual which "launched his career as the most prolific and influential magic author and translator until modern times."

In 1876, Professor Hoffman published Modern Magic to educate the public in how to become a magician, including how to perform sleight of hand tricks, as well as how to dress and speak. Hoffmann's book was successful, allowing him to become a full-time writer. He subsequently published a variety of books and articles, including the children's' novel Conjurer Dick and several compendiums of illusions. He also wrote on card games including patience.

 Works 
The following is a selection of Hoffmann's works:

 Modern Magic (1876)
 The Cyclopaedia of Card and Table Games. (1891).
 The Illustrated Book of Patience Games. (1892).
 Latest Magic, Being Original Conjuring Tricks [2020 reprint]
 Bridge (1924)
 Selected Patience Games (188?)
 Card Tricks with Apparatus'' (1892)

References 

20th-century English male writers
1839 births
1919 deaths
Card game book writers